Louis Cavalli (born 10 March 1907, date of death unknown) was a Swiss sports shooter. He competed in the trap event at the 1952 Summer Olympics.

References

1907 births
Year of death missing
Swiss male sport shooters
Olympic shooters of Switzerland
Shooters at the 1952 Summer Olympics
Place of birth missing